Velezia is a genus of plants in the family Caryophyllaceae.

Species
The Plant List recognises 2 accepted species:
 Velezia quadridentata  
 Velezia rigida

References

Caryophyllaceae
Caryophyllaceae genera